Cheman Ara Taiyab is a Bangladesh Awami League politician and the former member of parliament from a reserved seat.

Career
Taiyab was elected to parliament from reserved seat as a Bangladesh Awami League candidate in 2008.

References

Awami League politicians
Living people
Women members of the Jatiya Sangsad
9th Jatiya Sangsad members
21st-century Bangladeshi women politicians
21st-century Bangladeshi politicians
Year of birth missing (living people)